The characters 泉州 are also used for the name of the Chinese city of Quanzhou.

 was a province of Japan in the area of southern Osaka Prefecture. It bordered on Kii to the south, Yamato and Kawachi to the east, and Settsu to the north. In terms of the Gokishichidō system, Izumi was one of the provinces of the Kinai circuit. Under the Engishiki classification system, Izumi was ranked as one of the "inferior countries" (下国) in terms of importance. The provincial capital was located in the Fuchi neighborhood of what is now the city of Izumi. The ichinomiya of the province is the Ōtori taisha also located in Sakai.

History

Early history
According to the Shoku Nihongi, the Izumi and Hine Districts were separated from Kawachi Province on 23 April 716; moreover, on 8 May that same year, the Ōtori District was also separated from Kawachi, and the three districts were made into a province named . The name "Izumi" means , but is written with two characters, the character for  being prepended due to an imperial edict in 713. This character does not play into the reading. An imperial villa,  was in the area, and it seems that this has something to do with the unusual classification of : Yoshino-gen was the only other province with this designation. Afterwards, on 15 September 740, Izumi was abolished and merged back into Kawachi province. On 30 May 757, it was re-established with a normal province designation .

According to the Nihon Kiryaku, on 21 April 825, four counties from Settsu Province: Higashinari, Nishinari, Kudara, and Sumiyoshi were incorporated into Izumi Province, but the local residents were opposed to this change, so the area was restored to Settsu on 8 August the same year.

The provincial capital of Izumi was located in what is now the Fuchu neighborhood of the city of Izumi, Osaka. ）The site has been excavated and is marked with a stone monument. The provincial temple of Izumi, the Izumi Kokubun-ji was also located in the city of Izumi. There is no record of a provincial nunnery.

The Engishiki record of 927 AD lists one major and 52 minor Shinto shrines in the province. The major shrine is the Ōtori taisha, located in what is now Nishi-ku, Sakai. This was also the ichinomiya of the province. During the Heian period, Izumi was dominated by shōen landed estates, the largest of which was the Hine shōen, which was controlled by the aristocratic Kujō family.

During the Muromachi period, the Ashikaga clan appointed the Hosokawa clan as shugo of Izumi Province. In the early 15th century, the Miyoshi clan (from Awa Province in Shikoku) invaded and defeated the Hosokawa clan and their proxies, and became rulers over a large portion of the Kansai region. Miyoshi Yoshikata (1527-1562), the younger brother of Miyoshi Nagayoshi made Kishiwada Castle his base and extensively rebuilt its fortifications. The Miyoshi also developed Sakai into an international port and profited greatly from trade. Miyoshi rule proved to be short-lived and by the 1560s the clan was in eclipse and Izumi Province had collapsed into a patchwork of local strongmen. It became a battleground between the forces of Oda Nobunaga and the followers of the Saiga Ikki, local followers of the Ikkō-ikki movement, who sought to overthrow the feudal system and establish a theocratic republic, and later under Toyotomi Hideyoshi was the base for his conquest of Kii Province. During this period, Sakai was ruled by a councilor oligarchs, and became very rich on trade with China and the Europeans. It was also a center for matchlock rifle production.

Edo Period
Under the Tokugawa shogunate, the port of Sakai came under the rule of the Osaka machi-bugyō, and the province itself was divided into a patchwork of holdings directly by the shogunate (tenryō) or various daimyō

Meiji period
Following the Meiji restoration, Sakai became "Sakai Prefecture" in 1868 and gradually absorbed all of the tenryō and holdings of the various daimyō from other areas. The northern border the province with Settsu was adjusted in 1870 with part of the area of Sumiyoshi District of Settsu Province added into Ōtori District. The border was changed from roads of Ōshōji and Nagao Kaidō in Sakai to the Yamato River. Also in 1870, Mikami Domain in Ōmi Province relocated its seat to Yoshimi in Izumi, and was renamed "Yoshimi Domain" briefly before the abolition of the han system several months later in 1871. Yoshimi, Kishiwada and Hakata all became prefectures, which were then merged into . Sakai Prefecture was merged into Nara Prefecture on April 18, 1876, but was subsequently transferred to Osaka Prefecture on February 21, 1881 Per the early Meiji period , an official government assessment of the nation’s resources, the province had 352 villages with a total kokudaka of 170,885 koku. Izumi Province consisted of:

The districts were reduced from four to two on April 1, 1896:
 Senboku District (泉北郡) – merger of Ōtori and Izumi Districts; creating a district that covered the former northern part of Izumi Province
 Sennan District (泉南郡) – merger of Minami and Hine Districts; creating a district that covered the former southern part of Izumi Province

Shugo

Kamakura shogunate 
 1196–1203 – Sahara Yoshitsura
 1207–1221 – Emperor Go-Toba
 1221–1248 – Henmi clan
 1249–1261 – Hōjō Shigetoki
 1279–1300 – Hōjō Tokimura
 1313–1315 – Hōjō Hiroaki
 1315–1333 – Hōjō Shigetoki

Muromachi shogunate
 1336–1337 – Hatakeyama Kunikiyo
 1337–1347 – Hosokawa Akiuji
 1347–1349 – Kō no Moroyasu
 1349–1351 – Hatakeyama Kunikiyo
 1351–1352 – Hosokawa Akiuji
 1352–1359 – Hosokawa Nariuji
 1359–1360 – Hatakeyama Kunikiyo
 1360–1361 – Hosokawa Nariuji
 1369–1378 – Kusunoki Masanori
 1378–1391 – Yamana Ujikiyo
 1392–1399 – Ōuchi Yoshihiro
 1400–1403 – Nishiki Yoshikazu
 1407–1408 – Oku clan
 1408–1411 – Hosokawa Yorinaga
 1408–1448 – Hosokawa Motoyuki
 1411–1438 – Hosokawa Mochiari
 1438–1450 – Hosokawa Kiyoharu
 1448–1483 – Hosokawa Mochihisa
 1450–1480 – Hosokawa Tsuneari
 1480–1500 – Hosokawa Motoari
 1487–1495 – Hosokawa Katsunobu
 1500–1508 – Hosokawa Mototsune / Hosokawa Masahisa
 1513–1523 – The Hosokawa clan
 1523–1531 – Hosokawa Kurō
 1523–? – Hosokawa Gorō
 1536–1554 – Hosokawa Mototsune

Izumi-no-kami 
 Tachibana no Michisada
 Kakizaki Kageie
 Tōdō Takatora – First generation daimyō of Tsu Domain in Ise Province.
 Tōdō Takatsugu – Second generation daimyō of Tsu Domain in Ise Province.
 Tōdō Takahisa – Third generation daimyō of Tsu Domain in Ise Province.
 Tōdō Takachika – Fourth generation daimyō of Tsu Domain in Ise Province.
 Tōdō Takatoshi – Fifth generation daimyō of Tsu Domain in Ise Province.
 Tōdō Takahora – Seventh generation daimyō of Tsu Domain in Ise Province.
 Tōdō Takanaga – Eighth generation daimyō of Tsu Domain in Ise Province.
 Tōdō Takasato – Ninth generationdaimyō of Tsu Domain in Ise Province.
 Tōdō Takasawa – Tenth generation daimyō of Tsu Domain in Ise Province.
 Tōdō Takayuki – Eleventh generation daimyō of Tsu Domain in Ise Province.
 Matsudaira Ienori – daimyō of Iwamura Domain in Mino Province.
 Matsudaira Norinaga – daimyō of Iwamura Domain in Mino Province, Hamamatsu Domain in Tōtōmi Province, and Tatebayashi Domain in Kōzuke Province; Rōjū.
 Matsudaira Norihisa – daimyō of Tatebayashi Domain in Kōzuke Province and first generation Ōgyū Matsudaira daimyō of Karatsu Domain in Hizen Province.
 Matsudaira Noriharu – Second generation Ōgyū Matsudaira daimyō of Karatsu Domain in Hizen Province.
 Matsudaira Norisato – Third generation Ōgyū Matsudaira daimyō of Karatsu Domain in Hizen Province. daimyō of Toba Domain in Shima Province, Kameyama Domain in Ise Province, Yodo Domain in Yamashiro Province, and Sakura Domain in Shimōsa Province. Rōjū。
 Matsudaira Norisuke – daimyō of Sakura Domain in Shimōsa Province, Yamagata Domain in Dewa Province, and first generation Ōgyū Matsudaira daimyō of Nishio Domain in Mikawa Province.
 Matsudaira Norisada – Second generation Ōgyū Matsudaira daimyō of Nishio Domain in Mikawa Province.
 Matsudaira Norihiro – Third generation Ōgyū Matsudaira daimyō of Nishio Domain in Mikawa Province.
 Matsudaira Noriyasu – Fourth generation Ōgyū Matsudaira daimyō of Nishio Domain in Mikawa Province and Rōjū.
 Matsudaira Noritsune – Fifth generation Ōgyū Matsudaira daimyō of Nishio Domain in Mikawa Province.
 Tōyama Tomomasa – Fourth generation daimyō of Naeki Domain in Mino Province.
 Tōyama Tomonaka – Seventh generation daimyō of Naeki Domain in Mino Province.
 Tōyama Tomokiyo – Ninth generation daimyō of Naeki Domain in Mino Province.
 Enomoto Takeaki

See also 
Japanese cruiser Izumi, warship formerly named Esmeralda

Notes

References
 Nussbaum, Louis-Frédéric and Käthe Roth. (2005).  Japan encyclopedia. Cambridge: Harvard University Press. ;  OCLC 58053128

External links

  Murdoch's map of provinces, 1903

 
Former provinces of Japan